The 1927 Chicago Maroons football team was an American football team that represented the University of Chicago during the 1927 Big Ten Conference football season. In their 36th season under head coach Amos Alonzo Stagg, the Maroons compiled a 4–4 record, finished fourth in the Big Ten Conference, and were outscored by their opponents by a combined total of 68 to 65.

Fritz Crisler was an assistant coach on the team.

Schedule

References

Chicago
Chicago Maroons football seasons
Chicago Maroons football